The Wraith of Haddon Towers is a 1916 silent movie that is considered to be one of the first in the genre of horror films.

Plot
Phillip Drummond (Arthur Maude) is summoned from America to England to attend the bedside of his dying uncle, the Baron Drummond. Upon arriving at the castle where the baron lives, Phillip learns that he has a long-dead ancestor, also named Phillip Drummond, whose murder a century earlier is still a mystery. In a room of the castle that is always kept locked, he encounters the female spirit (Constance Crawley) of his dead ancestor's past lover. Phillip's interest in the paranormal leads him to seek out the haunts of this ghost, during which he finds out that he himself is actually the reincarnation of the former Phillip Drummond. His 
wife then arrives from America, just in time to find Phillip's body still warm after his spirit has departed to be with the "Wraith of Haddon Towers."

Cast

Constance Crawley
Arthur Maude
Beatrice Van
Leslie Reed

References

External links

1916 films
1916 horror films
American black-and-white films
American Film Company films
American silent short films
American supernatural horror films
1910s American films
Silent horror films